Government House is the official residence of the lieutenant governor of Newfoundland and Labrador. Government House was a by-product of the wave of administrative initiatives that took place during the 1820s. The royal charter of 1825 bestowed official colonial status for Newfoundland.

The first governors of Newfoundland were naval officers who resided on their flagship, anchored in St. John's harbour.  However, Admiral Richard Edwards decided it would be more apt for the Governor to live ashore, and thenceforth the governor resided at Fort Townshend, where the first Government House was constructed.  Completed in 1781, it was intended to be a summer house for the governors, but remained in constant use until the present structure was finished in 1831. Never intended for winter use, the inhabitants complained of the cold, and Francis Pickmore even died there in the winter of 1818.

The building plans for Government House were drawn up in England. The Ordinance had told the Treasury that workmen's wages were too high in Newfoundland, and subsequently, workmen in Scotland were engaged and arrived in St. John's to begin construction in April 1827. The original plan as conceived by Governor Cochrane was for a Palladian style two-storey house, plus basement.  When completed in 1831, Government House cost £38,175, which was five times the original estimate; equal to £ today. The two-storey building consists of a centre block flanked by slightly lower wings on the east and on the west. The exterior is of rough, red sandstone quarried at Signal Hill, trimmed with English Portland stone.

The construction of the new Government House was meant to reflect the proper status of the governor of a province that was now a proper British colony, and a key part of the Empire. The principal rooms for entertaining—a salon, dining room, and ballroom—along with the main entrance hall were laid out in such a manner as to allow for ceremonial processions, and pomp befitting a governor.

The Lieutenant-Governor's residence is where the Canadian Royal Family and visiting foreign dignitaries are greeted.  Inside are also reception rooms, offices and support facilities; the Lieutenant-Governor's office is the site of swearing-in ceremonies for Cabinet ministers, where Royal Assent is granted, and where the Lieutenant-Governor receives the Premier.

The site was designated a National Historic Site of Canada.

See also
 Government Houses of Canada
 Government Houses of the British Empire
 Lieutenant-Governors of Newfoundland and Labrador

References

External links
 Official website of Government House
 Newfoundland Heritage - Government House

Buildings and structures in St. John's, Newfoundland and Labrador
Newfoundland and Labrador
National Historic Sites in Newfoundland and Labrador
Houses in Newfoundland and Labrador
Palladian Revival architecture in Canada